Bear Spring Mountain is a mountain located in the Catskill Mountains of New York state, south of Walton, New York.

References

Mountains of Delaware County, New York
Mountains of New York (state)